"New Gold" is a song by British virtual band Gorillaz, featuring Australian music project Tame Impala, and American rapper Bootie Brown, marking the latter's second collaboration with the band since "Dirty Harry" in 2005. The track was released on 31 August 2022 as the second single from their eighth studio album, Cracker Island.

Background 
"New Gold" has been in production since 2020, and its earliest teaser was a post on Noodle's Instagram from 1 February 2020. However, the track was not included on Song Machine, Season One: Strange Timez, because, according to Damon Albarn, they "never seemed to get [their] tune finished". He also hinted that the song might finally be released as a part of the second season of Song Machine.  It was first played live during the Gorillaz World Tour 2022 on 19 August 2022. The song was eventually released on 31 August 2022 as the second single for Gorillaz' eight studio album Cracker Island.

Personnel 
Gorillaz
 Damon Albarn – vocals, synthesizers, production

Additional musicians and personnel
 Tame Impala – vocals, synthesizers, bass, guitars, drums, Wurlitzer, engineering, production
 Bootie Brown – vocals
 Greg Kurstin – synthesizers, bass, guitars, keyboards, percussion, engineering, production
 Samuel Egglenton – engineering
 Julian Burg – engineering
 Matt Tuggle – engineering
 David Reitzas – engineering
 Federico Fogolia – engineering
 Mark "Spike" Stent – mixing
 Matt Wolach – mixing assistance
 Randy Merrill – mastering

Charts

Release history

References 

2022 songs
2022 singles
Gorillaz songs
Tame Impala songs
Songs written by Damon Albarn
Songs written by Kevin Parker (musician)
Songs written by Greg Kurstin
Song recordings produced by Kevin Parker (musician)
Song recordings produced by Greg Kurstin
Parlophone singles
Warner Records singles
British disco songs
British funk songs
Alternative pop songs
British synth-pop songs